Manisha Ashok Chaudhary [ मराठी: मनीषा अशोक चौधरी ] is an Indian politician and member of the Bharatiya Janata Party. She is a second term member of the [[Maharashtra Legislative Assembly]She's known for her strong connect in north mumbai and In palghar district. she aggressively vocal on fisherman's issues and farmer issues in north konkan region.  ].

Constituency
Manisha Ashok Chaudhary (MLA) was elected Second time from the Dahisar(Mumbai) Assembly Constituency Maharashtra.

Positions held 
 Dahanu Mayor (1998-2001)
 BJP Thane Rural District head (2002-2005)
 president BJP Mahila Morcha (Maharashtra Pradesh)(2006-2009)
 BJP National Executive member 
Maharashtra Legislative Assembly MLA.
 Terms in office: 2014-2019
 2019- till date

References 

Maharashtra politicians
Bharatiya Janata Party politicians from Maharashtra
Maharashtra MLAs 2014–2019
Living people
Year of birth missing (living people)